Giambattista Diquattro (born 18 March 1954) is an Italian archbishop and Vatican diplomat. He has been Apostolic Nuncio to Brazil since 2020. He has worked in the diplomatic service of the Holy See since 1985 and been a nuncio and archbishop since 2005.

Biography
Diquattro was born on 18 March 1954 in Bologna and was ordained a priest for the diocese of Ragusa in 1981. He received his master's degree in civil law from the University of Catania, his Doctorate in Canon Law (JCD) from the Pontifical Lateran University in Rome, and his master's degree in dogmatic theology from the Pontifical Gregorian University in Rome.

He joined the diplomatic service of the Holy See on 1 May 1985, and served in diplomatic missions in the pontifical representations to the Central African Republic, the Democratic Republic of Congo and Chad, the United Nations in New York, and later in the Vatican Secretariat of State, and in the Apostolic Nunciature in Italy.

Pope John Paul II appointed him apostolic nuncio to Panama on 2 April 2005.

Pope Benedict XVI appointed him apostolic nuncio to Bolivia on 21 November 2008.

On 21 January 2017, Pope Francis named him Apostolic Nuncio to India and Nepal.

On 29 August 2020, Pope Francis named him Apostolic Nuncio to Brazil.

See also
 List of heads of the diplomatic missions of the Holy See

References

External links
 Catholic Hierarchy: Archbishop Giambattista Diquattro 

Apostolic Nuncios to India
Apostolic Nuncios to Nepal
Apostolic Nuncios to Bolivia
Apostolic Nuncios to Panama
Apostolic Nuncios to Brazil
Living people
Clergy from Bologna
21st-century Italian Roman Catholic titular archbishops
1954 births
Pontifical Lateran University alumni
Pontifical Gregorian University alumni
Diplomats from Bologna